Belinda Baudin (born June 13, 1955) is an American equestrian. She competed in two events at the 1988 Summer Olympics.

References

External links
 

1955 births
Living people
American female equestrians
American dressage riders
Olympic equestrians of the United States
Equestrians at the 1988 Summer Olympics
Sportspeople from Wellington City
21st-century American women